Nanbu Dam  is an earthfill dam located in Kagoshima Prefecture in Japan. The dam is used for irrigation and water supply.  The dam impounds about 10  ha of land when full and can store 374 thousand cubic meters of water. The construction of the dam was completed in 1969.

See also
List of dams in Japan

References

Dams in Kagoshima Prefecture